V. Munusamy (26 September 1913 – 4 January 1994), popularly known as Tirukkuralar Munusamy, was a Tamil scholar and politician highly regarded for his work on promoting the Tamil classical work of the Tirukkural. He also served as a member of Indian Parliament during 1952–1957.

Biography
Munusamy was born on 26 September 1913 in Thogaipadi village near Villupuram to A. Veerasamy and Veerammal. He did his schooling at St. Soosaiyappar Higher Secondary School in Tiruchi. He earned his bachelor’s degree in economics at St. Soosaiyappar College and in law at Government Law College in Chennai. By 1943, he became a scholar in Tamil.

Ever since his school days, Munusamy was attracted towards the Tirukkural and soon memorized all the 1330 verses of the Kural literature. With the intention to take it to the common man, he conducted his first public discourse in 1935 at Nootrukkal Mantapam in the Malaikottai neighbourhood of Tiruchi. In 1941, Munusamy conducted the first ever Tirukkural conference in Salem, which was attended by scholars such as Devaneya Pavanar. While staying in Puraisaiwalkam during his college years, he conducted Tirukkural classes and also campaigns holding Kural placards with scholars such as A. K. Paranthamanar, Natesanar, and Vadivelanar. Soon, he conducted a Kural conference in Chennai, which saw the participation of such professors as R. P. Sethupillai, Subramania Pillai, and Rasakannanar.

See also

 Tirukkural

References

1913 births
1994 deaths
Tirukkural commentators
Recipients of the Thiruvalluvar Award